Opening the Caravan of Dreams is a 1985 live album by jazz saxophonist Ornette Coleman and his Prime Time ensemble. It was recorded at a concert inaugurating the Caravan of Dreams, a then-newly opened performing arts center in Coleman's hometown of Fort Worth, Texas.

Critical reception

In a contemporary review for The Village Voice, Robert Christgau said Opening the Caravan of Dreams "lacks the studio-engendered beginning-middle-end that focuses Of Human Feelings and for that matter Metheny/Coleman's Song X. When it threatens to break altogether 'free,' its risks seem more like entropy than thrills and chills. But it's a live album showcasing one of the great improvisers, as well as musicians who never sound more authoritative than when following his orders." Robert Palmer wrote in The New York Times, "The event lent the music a certain raw edge and a bluesy vitality. But it also attains an impressive clarity; in many ways, it's a more openly accessible piece of work than the thick, thundering group improvisations heard on the Coleman-Pat Metheny Song X album." Scott Yanow later wrote in a review published by AllMusic, "this was the leading 'free funk' band of the 1980s, and this LP, which is worth a search by open-eared listeners, gives one a definitive look into the group's unusual music".

Track listing

Side one 
 "To Know What To Know" – 8:03
 "Harmolodic-Bebop" – 6:17
 "Sex Spy" – 5:43

Side two 
 "City Living" – 6:15
 "Seethru" – 4:35
 "Compute" – 9:01

Personnel

 Denardo Coleman – Drums
 Ornette Coleman – Alto Saxophone, Trumpet, Violin
 Charlie Ellerbie – Guitar
 Sabir Kamal – Drums
 Albert MacDowell – Bass
 Bern Nix – Guitar
 Jamaaladeen Tacuma – Bass

References

External links 
 

1985 live albums
Ornette Coleman live albums
Caravan of Dreams albums